Susan Mary Platt (born 4 October 1940) is a British former track and field athlete who competed for England and Great Britain in the javelin throw. She was a three-time Olympian and competed three times at the British Empire and Commonwealth Games.

Career
Born and educated at Copthall County Grammar School in Mill Hill in the London suburb of Barnet, she joined the London Olympiades athletics club, which was the country's leading all-women's club. Platt emerged at national level in 1959 with a win in the javelin at the Women's AAA Championships. She went on to take seven national titles in women's javelin at the AAA Championships in the 1960s, beginning in 1960 and her last coming in 1969. She also took three titles at the regional South of England Championships.

Platt made three appearances at the Summer Olympics – 1960, 1964 and 1968 – being Great Britain's leading female javelin thrower in the 1960s. She was among the best throwers of the period outside of Eastern Europe. She performed poorly at the 1962 European Athletics Championships, however, coming last in qualifying.

She was a three-time participant for England at the British Empire and Commonwealth Games. Her first outing in 1958 saw her finish in fourth place, one spot behind England teammate Averil Williams, but over ten metres behind winner Anna Pazera, who set a world record. Platt also competed in the shot put at that event, coming eighth in the final. In her third and final appearance for England, Platt placed sixth overall.

International competitions

National titles
AAA Championships
Javelin throw: 1960, 1961, 1962, 1966, 1967, 1968, 1969
Women's AAA Championships
Javelin throw: 1959
South of England Championships
Javelin throw: 1960, 1961, 1964

References

External links
All-Athletics profile

1940 births
Living people
People from Mill Hill
Athletes from London
English female javelin throwers
Olympic athletes of Great Britain
Athletes (track and field) at the 1960 Summer Olympics
Athletes (track and field) at the 1964 Summer Olympics
Athletes (track and field) at the 1968 Summer Olympics
Commonwealth Games gold medallists for England
Commonwealth Games medallists in athletics
Athletes (track and field) at the 1958 British Empire and Commonwealth Games
Athletes (track and field) at the 1962 British Empire and Commonwealth Games
Athletes (track and field) at the 1966 British Empire and Commonwealth Games
Medallists at the 1962 British Empire and Commonwealth Games